Jan Stuyt (21 August 1868, Purmerend - 11 July 1934, The Hague) was a Dutch architect.

Childhood and Education 
Stuyt was born the son of a cattle farmer. Due to the headmaster of his school, he was employed in 1883 at the office of Adrianus Bleijs (1842-1912), whose neo-Romanesque style would strongly influence Stuyt's work.

Career 
In 1891 Stuyt joined the Cuypers office in Amsterdam, where he became an overseer of the building of the Cathedral of Saint Bavo in Haarlem between 1895 and 1898. He then had a short career as an independent architect, during which he built his first church.

In 1899 Stuyt formed a partnership with Joseph Cuypers, son of Pierre Cuypers, which lasted until 1909. It seems that the architects in this period mostly worked on their own. Jan Stuyt mostly designed neo-Romanesque churches, often decorated with chessboard-like tile-decorations, which are present in many of the churches both during and after the partnership. Cuypers chose a more neo-Gothic approach, closely related to the work of his father.

Stuyt's style was greatly influenced by  Mediterranean (Italian, Byzantine, Islamic) architecture after his participation in the first Dutch pilgrimage to Palestine in 1903. Several of his most important churches were dome-churches, shaped after the Hagia Sophia in Constantinople. His less prestigious designs were often executed in a simple neo-Romanesque style, combining standard elements.

Besides churches Stuyt designed various other buildings and was also active in town planning, especially in the city of Heerlen. He was an architect for housing corporation Ons Limburg and in that function designed the Molenberg neighbourhood. In his profane designs influences from (neo-)Classicism and the work of K.P.C. de Bazel are apparent.

Stuyt Jr. 
After Stuyt's death, his son Giacomo C. Stuyt continued the office for several years, apparently with considerably less success, before becoming a diplomat. His first and best known work is the church of St. Paulus in Utrecht of 1937, which has been demolished already.

Another son of Jan Stuyt, Louis Stuyt became physician and Dutch Minister of Health and Environment.

List of Designs
Note: Not all his designs were actually built. Designs during his work together with Joseph Cuypers, between 1899-1909 are not listed here.

1898 Design for a church in Lodz, Russian Poland
1899 Design for a church in Copenhagen, Denmark
1899-1900 Sloten: church St. Pancratius
1906 Zeelst: church tower of St. Willibrordus
1907 Weebosch: church of St. Gerardus Majella.
1908 Wijkeroog: church of St. Jozef
1909 Eindhoven: office-building for Coöperatieve Centrale Boerenleenbank
1909 Eindhoven: Director's house
1910 Berkel-Enschot: church of St. Willibrordus
1911-1913 Alkmaar: restoration of town hall
1911 Naarden: church of St. Vitus 
1911 Overloon: church of St. Theobaldus
1911 Klein-Zundert: church of St. Willibrordus
1911 Heemskerk: town hall
1912-1913 Bergen op Zoom: church of St. Joseph
1912 Purmerend: town hall
1913 Rotterdam: design for town hall
1913-1915 Heilig Landstichting: Cenakelkerk church
1913-1914 Terborg: church of St. Gregorius
1913 Groningen: H. Hartkerk church
1913 Heiloo: church of O.L.V. ter Nood 
1913 Heerlen: Ambachtsschool (later called Technische School (Technical school)), located at 
1913 Hoensbroek: De Eerste Stap housing complex
1914-1916 's-Hertogenbosch: Drukkerij Teulings (now called De Bindery)
1915-1930 Heerlen: Molenberg
1915-1916 Maarn: Huis te Maarn
1915 Zoetermeer: church of St. Nicolaas
1915 Wormerveer: church of H. Maria Geboorte 
1916-1917 's-Hertogenbosch: church of St. Catharina
1916-1917 Eindhoven: church of St. Anthonius van Padua
1916 Harmelen: church of St. Bavo
1917-1920 Brunssum: De Rozengaard garden village
1917-1918 Mariaparochie: church of O.L. Vrouwe van Altijddurende Bijstand
1917 Voerendaal: enlargement church of St. Laurentius
1918-1919 Geleen: AW Kolonie
1919-1922 Heemstede: Hageveld seminary
1919 IJsselmuiden: church of O.L. Vrouwe Onbevlekt Ontvangen 
1920-1922 Heerlen: Vroedvrouwenschool (School for midwives)
1920 Amsterdam: church of St. Agnes
1921-1922 Den Haag: church of the Heilige Familie
1921-1924 Wierden: church of St. Johannes de Doper
1921 Brielle: ciborium 
1921 Den Haag: design of House of Representatives
1922-1924 Almelo: church of St. Egbertus
1922-1924 Den Haag: church of St. Gerardus Majella
1923-1926 Amsterdam: church of St. Gerardus Majella
1923 Egmond a/d Hoef: church of H. Margarita Maria Alacoque
1925-1927 Zundert: church of St. Trudo
1925-1926 Geesteren: church of St. Pancratius
1925 Alkmaar: St. Elisabeth hospital
1926 Koningsbosch: church of O.L. Vrouw Onbevlekt Ontvangen
1926-1928 Nijmegen: Neboklooster 
1926-1928 Almelo: St. Elisabeth hospital
1926-1927 Enschede: church O.L. Vrouwe van Altijddurende Bijstand
1927 Hillegom: church St. Joseph 
1927 Heiloo: church St. Willibrordus 
1928 De Steeg: church O.L. Vrouwe Hemelvaart
1928-1929 Zevenbergen: church of St. Bartholomeus
1929-1930 Dommelen: extension to church of St. Martinus
1930 Warmond: Philosophicum
1930 Heiloo: pilgrimage chapel of Onze Lieve Vrouwe ter Nood
1930-1931 Lisse: church of H.H. Engelbewaarders 
1931-1932 Keijenborg: church of St. Johannes de Doper
1932 Valkenswaard: church of St. Nicolaas 
1933 Rome: Building for the Nederlands Instituut
1934 Heerlen: Chapel for the Vroedvrouwenschool (School for midwives)

Year unknown 
Aerdenhout: houses Onder de Beuken, De Distel, Vredehove
Hazerswoude-Rijnsdijk: Lidwinagesticht
Overveen: houses
Rio de Janeiro: design for church of St. Andreas
Rijswijk: school
Rolduc: extension to seminary

Sources
Architects: Jan Stuyt (1868-1934) at www.archimon.nl

References

1868 births
1934 deaths
Dutch architects
Dutch ecclesiastical architects
Dutch Roman Catholics
People from Purmerend